The 2011 European Juveniles Baseball Championship was an under-12 international baseball competition held in Brest, Belarus from June 28 to July 2, 2011. It featured teams from Austria, Belarus, Czech Republic, Lithuania, Poland, Romania, Russia and Ukraine.

Schedule and results

Group stage

Pool A

Pool B

References

External links
Game Results

European Juveniles Baseball Championship
European Juveniles Baseball Championship
International sports competitions hosted by Belarus
Baseball in Belarus
2011 in Belarusian sport